The Transylvania Open is a tennis event held in Cluj-Napoca, Romania. The first edition was played in October 2021. Transylvania Open is part of the WTA Tour and is listed as a WTA 250 tournament.

The tournament is held at the BTarena on indoor hardcourts.

Past finals

Singles

Doubles

See also
Winners Open
Bucharest Open
Romanian Open
List of tennis tournaments

References

External links
Official site
BTarena website

WTA Tour
Tennis tournaments in Romania
Sport in Cluj-Napoca
Hard court tennis tournaments
2021 establishments in Romania
Recurring sporting events established in 2021
October sporting events